Paiela/Hewa Rural LLG is a local-level government (LLG) of Enga Province, Papua New Guinea.

Wards
01. Aspringa
02. Piawe-Bealo
03. Ingilepe
04. Kolombi Central
05. Waimalama
06. Komanga
07. Takopa
08. Taronga
09. Andita
10. Kole-Kanjiawi
11. Mandaukale
12. Papaki
13. Mt. Kare
14. Waiyalima
15. Paiela Station
16. Weyonga

References

Local-level governments of Enga Province